John Colicos (December 10, 1928 – March 6, 2000) was a Canadian actor. He performed on stage and television in the United States and Canada.

Career

Colicos was born in Toronto, Ontario, to a Greek father and a Canadian mother.

In 1957 he appeared in Mary Stuart at the Phoenix Theatre in New York City and in 1963 he appeared in Troilus and Cressida at the Stratford Festival in Stratford, Ontario, Canada. His other New York theatre credits are King Lear (1956), The Devils (1965–1966), Serjeant Musgrave's Dance (1966), and Soldiers (1968). Colicos' skill in acting resulted in his being chosen to play the title role in a memorable and first-ever production of King Lear (1964) at the Stratford Festival.

He appeared as Monks in a television version of Oliver Twist for the DuPont Show of the Month series in 1959. He also gave memorable performances in 1966 on the CBS soap opera The Secret Storm; as the unscrupulous Thomas Cromwell in the 1969 movie version of Anne of the Thousand Days; and as the governor of Umakran in the episode "The Goddess Calabra" from the 1973 TV show The Starlost.

On American television, he established himself as a science-fiction villain icon, portraying the first Klingon ever seen in the Star Trek franchise, Commander Kor in the Original Series episode "Errand of Mercy" (1967). Colicos worked with Gene Roddenberry designing the look the Klingons have on Star Trek (1966). Budget constraints prevented the extensive makeup the Klingons were supposed to have so Colicos suggested they have a leathery Genghis Khan look, dark skin and hair. He also portrayed Count Baltar in the original Battlestar Galactica movie and television series. Over a quarter-century after his initial appearance in the Star Trek franchise, Colicos reprised his role as the 140-year-old Kor in three episodes of Star Trek: Deep Space Nine, telecast between 1994 and 1998.

Aside from his science-fiction roles, Colicos also appeared numerous times in episodic television from the 1960s onwards, including the portrayal of the villain on three episodes of Mission: Impossible. He appeared in four episodes of the CBC docu-drama The National Dream as the "railway general" William Cornelius Van Horne and appeared in seven episodes of Mannix. The last person shot and killed in the television series Gunsmoke (1955–1975) was Judge Flood, played by Colicos in episode 631, Hard Labor.

Several years after his Battlestar Galactica tenure, Colicos again ventured into science fiction. In August and September 1981, he portrayed Mikkos Cassadine, a demented, power-mad businessman bent on freezing the world, on the ABC soap opera General Hospital. He was also the voice of the X-Men villain Apocalypse/En Sabah Nur (1993–1995) in the Fox Kids animated X-Men television series in the nineties, and twice played rogue alien Quinn in the first season (1988–1989) of War of the Worlds.

In 1982 he ventured into educational TV with TVOntario's award-winning production of Prophecy with John Colicos. The writer/director, Dr. Robert Gardner, recalled his initial meeting with the actor: "I had seen him scores of times in movies and television and I was very nervous. In truth, though, he was a joy to work with. Once he sensed that you were prepared he was thoroughly professional. His presence in the ninety-minute production was the main reason it went on to win the prestigious Gold Medal at the Atlanta International Film Festival."

He appeared in TV commercials during the 1990s for America's Best Contacts & Eyeglasses. Colicos' final acting appearance was his reprise of Count Baltar in the concept demonstration trailer Battlestar Galactica: The Second Coming, exhibited at many science fiction conventions in 1999.

Personal life
He married Mona McHenry in 1956 and they divorced in 1981. They had two sons, Nicholas (also an actor) and Edmund. Colicos died in Toronto on March 6, 2000, at the age of 71, after a series of heart attacks.

Filmography

Film

Television

References

External links
 
 
 

1928 births
2000 deaths
Canadian male film actors
Canadian people of Greek descent
Canadian male television actors
Canadian male voice actors
Members of the Order of Ontario
Male actors from Toronto
20th-century Canadian male actors